Fallow is the second studio album by Australian country music singer, Fanny Lumsden. It was released in March 2020 and peaked at number 10 on the ARIA Charts. 

At the ARIA Music Awards of 2020, the album won the ARIA Award for Best Country Album.

At the AIR Awards of 2021, the album won Best Independent Country Album or EP.

Track listing
All songs written by Edwina Lumsden

 "Mountain Song" - 1:56
 "This Too Shall Pass" - 3:20	
 "Peed in the Pool" - 3:41	
 "Grown Ups" - 3:27
 "Fierce" - 2:38
 "Tidy Town" - 4:26
 "Fallow" - 4:39
 "Wishing" - 2:34
 "These Days" - 3:44
 "Dig" - 3:24
 "Black and White" - 3:57
 "Mountain Song" (Reprise) - 2:29

Charts

References 

Fanny Lumsden albums
2020 albums
ARIA Award-winning albums